Ruggero Mannes (born 15 March 1998) is a Dutch professional footballer who plays for Dordrecht.

Club career
He made his Eerste Divisie debut for Almere City on 21 December 2018 in a game against Jong PSV, as a starter.

On 9 July 2021, he joined Dordrecht.

Career Statistics

Club

References

External links
 Career stats & Profile - Voetbal International

1998 births
Living people
Dutch footballers
Association football defenders
Sparta Rotterdam players
Almere City FC players
FC Dordrecht players
Eerste Divisie players
Tweede Divisie players
Derde Divisie players